Víctor Andrés Meseguer Cavas (born 9 June 1999) is a Spanish footballer who plays for CD Mirandés as a central midfielder.

Club career
Meseguer was born in Alguazas, Region of Murcia, and joined Real Murcia in 2017, for the Juvenil A squad. He made his senior debut with the reserves on 11 February 2018, playing the last three minutes of a 1–3 Tercera División away loss against UCAM Murcia CF B. He scored his first senior goal on 11 November, netting the opener in a 1–1 home draw against the same opponent.

Meseguer made his first team debut for Murcia on 24 March 2019, coming on as a late substitute for fellow youth graduate Juanma Bravo in a 2–1 away win against Club Recreativo Granada in the Segunda División B. On 4 July, he renewed his contract with the club, and subsequently began to feature regularly for the main squad during the season, contributing with two goals in 20 appearances overall.

On 1 September 2020, Meseguer agreed to a three-year contract with Segunda División side CD Mirandés. He made his professional debut twelve days later, starting in a 0–0 home draw against AD Alcorcón.

Meseguer scored his first professional goal on 2 January 2021, netting the equalizer in a 1–2 loss at UD Logroñés. He finished the season as an undisputed starter, scoring three goals in 38 appearances.

On 10 August 2022, Meseguer signed a five-year contract with Granada CF, freshly relegated to the second division.

References

External links

1999 births
Living people
Spanish footballers
Footballers from the Region of Murcia
Association football midfielders
Segunda División players
Segunda División B players
Tercera División players
Real Murcia Imperial players
Real Murcia players
CD Mirandés footballers
Granada CF footballers